Tommy Kemp (12 August 191526 November 2004) was a rugby union international who represented England from 1937 to 1948. He also captained his country.

Early life
Tommy Kemp was born on 12 August 1915 in Bolton.

Rugby union career
Kemp made his debut for England on 16 January 1937 at Twickenham when they played Wales.  Of the five matches he played for his national side he was on the winning side on three occasions.  He played his final match for England on 17 January 1948 at Twickenham when he again played Wales.

Outside rugby
Kemp qualified as a doctor at St Mary's Hospital Medical School. During the Second World War he joined the Royal Army Medical Corps and served in the Middle East. He also worked at St Mary's Hospital and the now defunct Paddington General Hospital.

Kemp was survived by his wife Ruth (née Scott-Keat) and their son and daughter.

References

1915 births
2004 deaths
alumni of St Mary's Hospital Medical School
British Army personnel of World War II
England international rugby union players
English rugby union players
people educated at Denstone College
Royal Army Medical Corps officers
Rugby union fly-halves
Rugby union players from Bolton